All Saints' Church, Oakham is a parish church in the Church of England in Oakham, Rutland. It is Grade I listed.

History

The spire of Oakham parish church dominates distant views of the town for several miles in all directions. The impressive west tower and spire, built during the 14th century in the Decorated Gothic style, are slightly earlier in date than most of the rest of the exterior of the building, which (apart from some Victorian restoration) is in the Perpendicular style. Oddly, the south doorway and its porch seem to be the oldest parts of the church, the doorway probably dating from the early 13th century with the porch having been added later that century.

In the light, spacious interior there is more evidence of the mature Decorated style of the 14th century. The tall, slender columns of the nave have intricately carved capitals showing animals, birds, figures, foliage and scenes from the Bible including Adam and Eve, the Expulsion from the Garden of Eden, the Annunciation and the Coronation of the Virgin Mary. There is also a fine Green Man.

It is a Grade I listed building. It was restored in 1857 to 1858 by Sir George Gilbert Scott.

Bells

During the church restoration in 1858 the first stage of the tower was fitted with a new ringing floor and the bells were rehung in a new oak frame. Two bells were re-cast by Mears of London.

There is a ring of eight bells cast by Gillett & Johnston in 1910, and a priest's bell of 1840.

On 9 December 1923 the tenor bell broke loose from the headstock but fortunately was captured in the bell frame and did not penetrate into the ringing room. The bell frame was still in a poor condition in 1937 which prevented it being used to ring for the Coronation of King George VI.

Organ

An organ by Brindley & Foster was installed in 1872 in the Lady Chapel at a cost of £750. It was enlarged in 1896. In 1937, Roger Yates improved and electrified it, and moved it to the north west corner of the Church, with the console in the Trinity Chapel. This organ was removed in 1994.

The new two manual pipe organ dates from 1996 and is by the builder Kenneth Tickell and Company. A specification of the organ can be found on the National Pipe Organ Register.

Organists

Parish status
Oakham Parish Church is in a team ministry with:
St Andrew's Church, Hambleton
St Edmund's Church, Egleton
All Saints' Church, Braunston-in-Rutland
St Peter's Church, Brooke, Rutland
Church of St Peter and St Paul, Langham
St Andrew's Church, Whissendine
Holy Trinity Church, Teigh
St Mary's Church, Ashwell, Rutland
Church of St Peter and St Paul, Market Overton

Gallery

References

External links

Grade I listed churches in Rutland
Church of England church buildings in Rutland
Oakham